The 9th Dáil was elected at the 1937 general election on 1 July 1937 and met on 21 July 1937. The members of Dáil Éireann, the house of representatives of the Oireachtas (legislature) of the Irish Free State, are known as TDs. Seanad Éireann, a second chamber in the Irish Free State, had been abolished in May 1936.

On 29 December 1937, the Constitution of Ireland came into effect, with the state being renamed as Ireland. The Oireachtas established under this constitution was bicameral, and an indirect election to the new Seanad Éireann took place in April 1938, forming the 2nd Seanad.

The 9th Dáil was dissolved on 27 May 1938. The 9th Dáil lasted  days. There were no by-elections during the 9th Dáil.

Composition of the 9th Dáil

Fianna Fáil, denoted with bullet, formed the 8th Executive Council of the Irish Free State, a minority government dependent on the support of the Labour Party. This became the 1st Government of Ireland on 29 December 1937, on the coming into operation of the Constitution.

Graphical representation
This is a graphical comparison of party strengths in the 9th Dáil from July 1937. This was not the official seating plan.

Ceann Comhairle
On 21 July 1937, Frank Fahy (FF), who had served as Ceann Comhairle since 1932, was proposed by Éamon de Valera and seconded by William Norton for the position, and was elected without a vote.

TDs by constituency
The list of the 138 TDs elected is given in alphabetical order by Dáil constituency.

Changes

References

External links
Houses of the Oireachtas: Debates: 9th Dáil

 
09
9th Dáil